Eures may refer to:
Robert Eures, 18th-century English cricketer
EURES, EU network of public employment services